Alicia Catherine Mant (15 July 1788 – 26 February 1869) was a 19th-century  English writer of children's stories which tended to have strong moralistic underpinnings.

Life and work
She was born Alicia Catherine Mant to  Rev. Richard Mant and Elizabeth Roe Mant on 15 July 1788 in Southampton, Hampshire.  Her father was the King Edward's Grammar School headmaster and he was rector of All Saints in Southampton. Mant was last of nine children, one of whom was Richard Mant, later a bishop in Ireland. She wrote a number of novels and produced at least one game before marrying a man fourteen years her junior in 1835. He was Rev James Russell Phillott.  Mant died 26 February 1869 in Ballymoney, County Antrim. She and her husband are buried in Ballymoney, where they lived.

Her works are still included in anthologies of stories for children.

Bibliography
 Ellen; or, The Young Godmother (1812)
 Caroline Lismore; or, The Errors of Fashion (1815)
 The Canary Bird (1817)
 Montague Newburgh; or, The Mother and Son (1817)
 Margaret Melville, and The Soldier's Daughter; or, Juvenile Memoirs (1818)
 The Cottage in the Chalk Pit (1822)
 The Young Naturalist (1824)
 Christmas, a Happy Time (1932)

References 

1788 births
1869 deaths
19th-century British women writers
Women novelists from Northern Ireland
British women children's writers
British children's writers
Writers from Southampton